Yim Jae-beom (also spelled Yim Jae-bum; born October 14, 1962) is a South Korean rock ballad singer who is widely regarded as one of South Korea's best vocalists. He debuted in 1986 as the vocalist for the heavy metal band Sinawe. After recording with other bands, including Asiana and Rock in Korea, Yim released his first solo album in 1991.

Career 
In 2011, Yim joined the cast of I Am a Singer where he placed first two times. On May 23, 2011, I Am a Singer announced that Yim would be taking a temporary leave from the show.

He released a new solo album, "Day by Day" which reached No.2 on Hanteo Daily Charts on September 19.

He also took part in the OST of the successful Korean drama City Hunter with the song "Love".

In 2013, Yim released a duet with South Korean singer, Ali, titled "I Love You".

Personal life 
Yim was married to musical actress Song Nam-yeong from 2001 until her death from cancer in 2017. The couple has one daughter named Ji-soo.

Discography

Studio albums

Filmography

Television shows

Web shows

Awards and nominations

References

External links 

1962 births
Living people
South Korean male singers
South Korean rock singers